A general election was held on 7 July 2012 to elect members to the 200 seats of the General National Congress of Libya. 80 of the seats were to be decided through party-list proportional representation and the 120 other seats were open to individual candidates. Members were elected from 13 constituencies throughout the country.

Constituency No. 1:   Tobruk/ El Guba/ Derna
A. Individual List

Tobruk   Seats: 3.   Candidates: 96

Elected:

• Abdul Sadeq Hamad Abdul Saed Eswedeq  –  7,879  (17.89%)

• Othman Idris Ekraem Wagi  – 3,863  (8.77%)

• Mohamed Younis Ahmed Al-Manfi  – 3,171  (7.2%)

El Guba   Seats: 1.   Candidates: 14

Elected:

• Abdul Kareem Faraj Hussein Adam  –  4,315  (40.49%)

Derna   Seats: 2.   Candidates: 27

Elected:

• Hassan Eswehel Abdullah Esteta  –  13,807  (39.34%)

• Abdul Fattah Khalifa Arwag Ashlewi  – 3,936  (11.21%)

B. Party List   Seats: 5.   Parties standing: 15

National Forces Alliance  – 62,061 votes  (67.72%)  4 seats won

Elected:

• Munsef Mohamed Ehwel Naseeb

• Ibtesam Saad Essunussi Esteta

• Tawfeeq Ebraek Abdul Salam Othman

• Fareeha Khalifa Mohamed Al-Berkawi

Justice and Construction Party –  8,828 votes (9.63%)  1 seat won

Elected:

• Mansour Ebraek Abdul Kareem Al-Hassadi

___

Constituency No. 2:    Shahhat, Bayda,  Marj, Qasr Libya 

A. Individual List

Shahhat   Seats: 1.   Candidates: 18

Elected:

• Fawzi Rajab Al-Aghab Abdullah   –  4,196 (31.66%)

Bayda   Seats: 2.   Candidates: 75

Elected:

• Abd Rabbah Yousef Bu Breg Mikael  –  5,445 (13.89%)

• Abdul Hafeed Mohamed Hamad Addaekh  –  3,285 (8.38%)

Marj   Seats: 2.   Candidates: 42

Elected:

• Ezzidden Mohamed Younis Yahya  –  2,353 (12.44%)

• Sherif El-Wafi Mohamed Ali   – 1,658  (8.76%)

Qasr Libya   Seats: 1.   Candidates 13

Elected:

• Abdul Aali Anwar Mahmoud Al-Murtada  –  1,144, 13.98%

B. Party List   Seats: 5    Parties Standing: 14

National Forces Alliance  –  48,846  (60.41%)   3 seats won

Elected:

• Najah Salouh Abdussalam Abdul Nabi

• Abdul Jalil Mohamed Abdul Jalil Ezzahi

• Zainab Haroun Mohamed Ettargi

Justice and Construction Party  –  6,572  (8.13%)  –  1 seat won

Elected:

• Salah Mohamed Hasan Eshaib

National Central Party  –  4,929 (6.10%)  –  1 seat won

Elected:

• Abdulkarim Salah Yunis Al-Jiash

___

Constituency No. 3:   Benghazi, Tokra, Al-Abiar, Salloug and Gemenis 

A. Individual List

Benghazi   Seats: 9.   Candidates: 258

Elected:

• Saleh Besheer Salah Ajouda  – 40,207  (22.61%)

• Suleiman Awad Faraj Zubi  – 34,975  (19.67%)

• Mohamed Khalil Ahmed Ezzaroug   – 5,634 (3.17%)

• Ahmed Mohamed Ali Yusef Langi  –  3,286  (1.85%)

• Faraj Saad Faraj Sasi Al-Werfeli  – 3,227  (1.81%)

• Al-Kamel Mohamed Mukhtar Al-Jetlawi  - 3,098  (1.74%)

• Omar Khaled Jabar Al Obeidi   – 2,936 (1.65%)

• Abdul Munem Faraj Abdul Ghani Al-Waihaishi   – 2,734  (1.54%)

• Alladdeen Moustafa Yousef Al-Megaref  –  2,378  (1.34%)

Tokra   Seats: 2   Candidates: 15

Elected:

• Fehaim Ali Saad Arrateb   – 787  (22.77%)

• Salem Mohamed Abdullateef Bu Janat   – 579  (16.75%(

Al-Abiar   Seats: 2.   Candidates: 32

Elected:

• Mohamed Sulima Mohamed Al-Badri   – 2,215  (24.74%)

• Mohamed Ejwaili Abdulaali Abdullah  –  804  (8.98%)

Gemenis   Seats: 1.   Candidates: 9

Elected:

• Abdullah Omran Mohamed Al-Gmati   – 1,349  (37.95%)

Salloug   Seats: 1.   Candidates: 13

Elected:

• Najmiddeen Abdul Jalil Saleh Ennemr   – 1,066 (19.85%)

B. Party List   Seats: 11    Parties Standing: 20

National Forces Alliance   – 132,425  (64.46%)  –  7 seats won

Elected:

• Ahmed Salem Mansour Ben Swaid

• Amina Mohamed Besheer Mustafa Al-Megherbi

• Ibrahim Hassan Ibrahim Al-Gheriani

• Soad Miftah Hamad Al-Ghdairi

• Ali Arrefaee Faraj Zubi

• Haleema Abdul Matloub Younis Al-Werfeli

• Assaed Saleh Al-Mahdi Al-Haddad

Justice and Construction Party  –  23,490  (11.43%)  –  2 seats won

Elected:

• Huda Abdullateef Awad Al-Bennani

• Abdul Rahman Abdul Majeed Abdul Hameed Addibani

National Front Party  – 14,304  (6.96%)  – 1 seat won

Elected:

• Ibrahim Abdul Aziz Ibrahim Sahad

Arresalah  –  7,860  (3.83%)  –  1 seat won

Elected:

•  Mohamed Ammari Mohamed Zaed

___

Constituency No. 4:  Ajdabiya, Brega, Jalu, Ojala, Ejkherra, Tazerbo and Kufra 

A. Individual List

Ajdabiya   Seats: 4, Candidates: 68

Elected:

• Nouriddeen Suliman Mustafa Sherif   – 2,281  (8.99%)

• Mohamed Saad Emazab Ehwaij  – 2,215  (8.73%)

• Mousa Faraj Saleh Faraj  – 1,742 (6.87%)

• Abdul Salam Khamis Abdul Nabi Al Ajhar  – 1,440  (5.68%)

Brega   Seats: 1.   Candidates: 11

Elected:

• Othman Aed Mohamed Mazkour   – 1,578  (44.18%)

Jalu, Ojala, Ejkherra   Seats : 1.    Candidates: 7

Elected:

• Awad Mohammed Awad Abdul Saddeq  – 4,946  (48.03%)

Tazerbu   Seats: 1.   Candidates: 14

Elected:

• Mohamed Abdul Kareem Abdul Hameed Douma  –  276  (16.74%)

Kufra   Seats: 2.   Candidates: 30

Elected:

• Senussi Salem Omar Al-Ghami  – 7,555 (37.75%)

• Hamed Suliman Saleh El-Heta  –  7,422  (37.08%)

B. Party List   Seats: 3    Parties Standing: 14

National Forces Alliance  – 18,516  (30.19%)   1 seat won

Elected:

• Fatma Essa Jumma Essa

Al Hekma Party  – 14,479  (26.87%)   1 seat won

Elected:

• Tuati Hamad Ali Al-Eda

National Front Party   – 10,985  (17.91%)   1 seat won

Elected:

• Mohamed Yusuf Mohamed Al-Magariaf

___

Constituency No. 5:   Sidra, Sirte and Jufra 

A. Individual List

Sidra   Seats: 1.   Candidates: 11

Elected:

• Saad Ibrahim Bin Sharrada Ibrahim  – 2,787  (41.02%)

Sirte   Seats: 2.   Candidates: 45

Elected:

• Miftah Faraj Saleh Omar Shanbour   – 2,424  (16.56%)

• Abdul Jalil Mohammed Abdul Jalil Eshawesh  – 2,377  (16.24%)

Jufra   Seats: 2.   Candidates: 18

Elected:

• Ali Zidan Mohamed Zidan  – 4,349  (47.78%)

• Senussi Mohamed Senussi Eddubri  – 1,468  (16.13%)

B. Party List   Seats: 4   Parties Standing: 8

National Forces Alliance  – 9,717  (33.19%)   1 seat won

Elected:

• Mohamed Ahmed Miftah Al-Arrishiyah

Al Watan for Development  – 6,919  (23.63%)   1 seat won

Elected:  Imtair Miftah Othman El Emharher

Central Youth Party  – 3,517  (12.01%)   1 seat won

Elected:

• Saleh Younis Naji Misbah

Justice and Construction Party  –  3,325 (11.36%)   1 seat won

Elected:

• Amna Faraj Khalifa Emtair

___

Constituency No. 6:   Sebha and Wadi Eshatti 

A. Individual List

Sebha   Seats: 4.   Candidates: 96

Elected:

• Abdul Qader Omar Mohamed Ehwaili  – 3,383  (9.94%)

• Abdul Jalil Gaith Abu Baker Omar Saif Ennasr  – 2,482  (7.29%)

• Mohamed Abdullah Mohamed Ettumi   – 2,353  (6.92%)

• Mohamed El Menawi Ahmed Al-Hudairi  – 2,111 (6.20%)

Wadi Eshatti (Brak)   Seats: 1, Candidates: 15

Elected:

• Mohamed Besheer Misbah Bin Meskeen   – 676  (16.23%)

Wadi Eshatti (Al Gurda)   Seats: 1.   Candidates: 30

Elected:

• Zidan Misbah Abdullah Mohamed Marzoug – 903  (14.46%)

Wadi Eshatti (Idri)   Seats: 1.   Candidates: 19

Elected:

• Hamed Abdussalam Abdullah Al-Baghdadi   – 811  (16.43%)

B. Party List

i. Sebha    Seats: 5   Parties Standing: 21

National Forces Alliance  –  9,611  (28.30%)   2 seats won

Elected:

• Soad Mohammed Ali Ahmed Ghannour

• Shukri El Amin Mohamed El Magherbi

National Labaika Party  – 3,472  (10.22%)   1 seat won

Elected:

• Fatima Mohamed Abu Bakr Mohamed Al-Abbassi

Justice and Construction Party  – 2,829  (8.33%)   1 seat won

Elected:

• Mohamed Ahmed Mohamed Arrish

Libyan National Party  – 2,467   (7.26%)   1 seat won

Elected:

• Naji Mukhtar Ali Embarak

ii. Wadi Eshatti (Brak), Wadi Eshatti- Al Gurda, Wadi Eshatti- Idri   Seats: 4   Parties Standing: 13

Justice and Construction Party  – 2,549  (17.56%)   1 seat won

Elected:

• Saleh Mohamed Al Makhzoum Essaleh

Arrakeeza  – 1,525   (10.51%)   1 seat won

Elected:

• Essenussi Erhouma Mohamed Erhouma

Al Watan and Development  – 1,400  (9.64%)   1 seat won

Elected:

• Abdul Hadi Ahmed Al-Mahdi Asherif

National Party of Wadi Eshatti  –  1,355  (9.33%)   1 seat won

Elected:

• Mohamed Khalifa Mohamed Najim

___

Constituency No. 7:   Obari, Ghat and Murzuk 

A. Individual List

Obari   Seats: 2.   Candidates: 42

Elected:

• Hussein Mohamed Ahmed Mohamed Al-Ansari  – 4,207  (21.83%)

• Ali Abdul Aziz Abdul Salam Ali  – 1,854  (9.62%)

Ghat   Seats: 2.   Candidates: 12

Elected:

• Abdulqader Sidi Omar Sidi Eshaikh El-Hash  – 1,054  (23.71%)

• Mohamed Ibrahim Makhi Abdulqader  –  974  (21.91%)

Murzuk   Seats: 4.   Candidates: 38

Elected:

• Masoud Abdul Salam Ebaid Ettaher  – 6,296  (22.34%)

• Ettaher Mohamed Makni Gouri  – 5,215  (18.50%)

• Hammad Mohamed Mohamed Essaleh Ebrekawi  – 5,192 (18.42%)

• Abdul Wahab Mohamed Abu Baker Gaed  – 5,004  (17.76%)

B. Party Lists

i. Obari   Seats: 4.    Parties 12

Wadi Al-Hayah Party for Democracy and Development  –  6,947  (35.83%) 1 seat won

Elected:

• Abdul Razzaq El Mahdi Emhemed Ezwain

• Nadia Errashid Omar Errashid

Justice and Construction Party  –  2,347  (12.10%)   2 seats won

Elected:

• Mona Abu Al-Qasim Omar

Libyan Party for Liberty and Development   – 2,240  (11.55%)   1 seat won

Elected:

• Ibrahim Mohamed Eddah Mohamed

ii. Murzuk    Seats: 3.   Candidates: 11

National Forces Alliance   – 7,652  (27.77%)   1 seat won

Elected:

• Ahlam Abdullah Ibrahim Allouwa

National Parties Alliance  –  5,725  (20.78%)   1 seat won

• Zinab Shatta Hassan Hamed

Al Ummah Al Wasat Party   – 4,989  (18.11%)   1 seat won

Elected:

Mohamed Abdul Nabi Bagi Hussein

___

Constituency No. 8:   Gharian 

There were no party lists in Gharian constituency.  All seats were for individual candidates.

Gharian   Seats: 3.   Candidates: 59

Elected:

• Mohamed Yunis Mohamed Ettumi  – 16,420  (42.48%)

• Idris Mohamed Mohamed Abu Faed  – 2,145 (5.55%)

• Ramadan Embaia Abu Abdullah Khalifa  – 1,785  (4.62%)

Al-Asabaa   Seats: 1.   Candidates: 11

Elected:

• Eddawi Ali Ahmed El-Muntaser  – 5,203  (49.02%)

Kekla/ El-Galaa   Seats: 1.   Candidates: 6

Elected:

• Abdulaziz Ettaher Ehreba Zabasi Al-Kekli  – 5,483  (66.91%)

Yefren   Seats: 1.   Candidates: 16

Elected:

• Suliman Yunis Emhemed Gajam  – 4,303  (48.53%)

Arriyaynah   Seats: 1.   Candidates: 9

Elected:

• Abu’l-Qasim Abdulgader Mohamed Derz  – 1,016  (38.33%)

Arrihibat   Seats: 1.   Candidates: 14

Elected:

• Abu Bakr Ali Ehmouda Dau  – 2,065 (51.00%)

Rujban   Seats: 1. Candidates: 6

Elected:

• Abu Bakr Mohamed Emhemed Abdulgader  – 3,313  (46.66%)

Jadu   Seats: 1.   Candidates: 12

Elected:

• Saeed Khalifa Essa Al Khattali  – 1,645  (35.62%)

Zintan   Seats: 2.   Candidates: 24

Elected:

• Abdussalam Abdullah Mohamed Nassiyah  –1,602  (17.27%)

• Mohamed Abdul Gader Salem Betru  –1,522  (16.41%)

Mizdah   Seats: 1.   Candidates: 22

Elected:

• Ibrahim Ali Mohamed Abu Shaala  – 9,279  (68.23%)

Nalut   Seats: 1.   Candidates: 8

Elected:

• Shabaan Ali Esssa Abu Sitta  – 5,294  (49.04%)

Batin Al Jabal   Seats: 1.   Candidates: 18

Elected:

• Abdulhamid Daw Ali Al-Khanjari  – 976  (17.51%)

Kabaw   Seats: 1   Candidates: 9

Elected:

• Jumma Ali Saleh Eshawesh  – 3,850  (49.61%)

Ghadames   Seats: 1.   Candidates: 7

Elected:

• Abu Bakr Murtada Mukhtar Emdawer  – 3,976  (57.82%)

___

Constituency No. 9: Tawergha, Misrata, Bani Walid and Zliten 

A. Individual List

Tawergha   Seats: 1.   Candidates: 4

Elected:

• Maree Mohamed Mansour Raheel  – 3,572  (67.99%)

Misrata   Seats: 4.   Candidates: 117

Elected:

• Jumma Ahmed Abdullah Ateega  – 15,542  (15.89%)

• Omar Mohamed Ali Abu Leefa  – 9,144  (9.35%)

• Hassan Mohamed Ali Lameen  – 5,143  (5.26%)

• Sallahiddeen Omar Beshr Badi  – 3,960  (4.05%)

Bani Walid   Seats: 2.   Candidates: 25

Elected:

• Salem Al Ahmar Al Hadi Ali  – 5,399  (38.62%)

• Amna Mahmoud Mohamed Takhikh  – 3,374  (24.13%)

Zliten   Seats: 2.   Candidates: 46

Elected:

• Abdullah Ali Abdullah Jawan  – 10.077  (21.22%)

• Mohamed Shabban Miftah Al Walid  – 6,728  (14.17%)

B. Party Lists

i. Misrata  Seats: 4.  Parties standing: 11

Union for Homeland  – 24,815   (27.08%)   1 seat won

Elected:

• Abdul Rahman Ashibani Ahmed Asswaihli

Justice and Construction Party –  20,503  (22.37%)   1 seat won

Elected:

• Zinab Abu Al-Qasim Abdullah Bayou

National Front Party  – 13,669  (14.91%)   1 seat won

Elected:

• Mohamed Ali Abdullah Addarrat

National Forces Alliance  – 8,018  (8.75%)   1 seat won

Elected:

• Hana Jebril Essalheen Al-Orfi

ii. Zliten   Seats: 3.   Parties standing: 9

National Forces Alliance  – 25,789  (54.69%)   2 seats won

Elected:

• Omar Mohamed Omar Ehmedan

• Salma Mohamed Emhemed Ekhail

Justice and Construction Party  – 7,971  (16.90%)   1 seat won

Elected:

• Abdussalam Ibrahim Esmail Asafrani

___

Constituency No. 10: Tarhouna, Emeslata, Khoms Sahel, Khoms Medina and Qasr Al-Akhiar 

A. Individual List

Tarhouna    Seats: 2.   Candidates: 44

Elected:

• Annifishi Abdussalam Abdul Manee Abdussalam  – 4,926  (22.74%)

• Ahmed Faraj Hassan Assadi  – 1,333  (6.15%)

Emeslata   Seats: 1.   Candidates: 28

Elected:

• Hammed Muammar Emhemed Erwaimi  – 3,030  (19.79%)

Khoms Sahel   Seats: 2. Candidates: 43

Elected:

• Mohamed Miftah Mohamed Takala  – 1,961  (9.75%)

• Abdulmonem Hussein Essadiq  Al-Yaseer  – 1,553  (7.72%)

Khoms Medina

Elected:

• Akram Ali Jumma Al-Jenin  – 4,066  (22.16%)

• Mukhtar Salem Ali Al-Atrash  – 3,182  (17.34%)

Qasr Al-Akhiar, Seats 1, Candidates 20

Elected:

• Mohamed Ali Saleem Saleem  – 3,849       35.55%)

B. Party List     Seats: 3. Parties Standing:  14

National Forces Alliance  – 27,957  (50.30%)   2 seats won

Elected:

• Salem Ali Mohamed Alo Hammali

• Ola Fathi Essunussi Asuwaisi

Justice and Construction Party  – 7,574  (13.63%)   1 seat won

Elected:

• Emhemed Muammar Abdullah Diab

___

Constituency No. 11: Tripoli, Garbulli, Tajoura, Suq Al-Juma, Hay Al-Andalus, Abu Sleem, Ain Zara 

A. Individual List

Garabulli   Seats: 1. Candidates: 17

Elected:

• Ajaili Mohamed Misbah Abu Esdail  – 2,400  (26.80%)

Tajoura   Seats: 2. Candidates: 28

Elected:

• Mohamed Mohamed Ahmed Sasi  – 13,393  (28.34%)

• Mahmous Salama Mohamed Al-Ghariani  – 11,128  (23.54%)

Suq Al-Juma   Seats: 4.   Candidates: 125

Elected:

• Abdulfattah Emhemed Al-Amin Allabeeb  – 21,196  (21.29%)

• Ehmeda Saleh Assaid Eddali  – 14,336  (14.40%)

• Mohamed Ehmeda Essegir Esmoud  – 5,337  (5.36%)

• Jalal Omar Miftah Hassan  – 5,292  ( 5.32%)

Hay Al-Andalus   Seats: 3.   Candidates: 136

Elected:

• Mohamed Ahmed Nasr Abu Esnena  – 12,099 (12.32%)

• Nizar Ahmed Yusef Kawan  – 8,851  (9.74%)

• Abdurrahman Khalifa Ramadan Al-Shater  – 6,807  (7.49%)

Abu Sleem Seats: 2.   Candidates: 86

Elected:

• Mahmoud Abdul Aziz Milad Hassan  – 14,081  (25.09%)

• Ageela Omran Ageela Bin Miftah  – 6,147  (10.95%)

Ain Zara   Seats: 2.   Candidates: 67

Elected:

• Mahmoud Al Mukhtar Taher Atabeeb  – 7,628  (18.34%)

• Abdul Naser Miftah Ahmed Aseklani  – 2,074  (4.99%)

B. Party Lists

i. Garbulli, Tajoura, Suq Al-Juma    Seats: 3. Parties Standing: 26

National Forces Alliance  – 83,213  (50.08%)   2 seats won

Elected:

• Hajer Mohamed Suliman Al-Gaed.

• Khaled Ibrahim Mukhtar Sola

Al-Asala and Renovation Party   16,593  (10.58%)   1 seat won

Elected:

• Ahmed Mohamed Ali Boni

ii. Central Tripoli   Seats: 3.   Parties Standing: 39

National Forces Alliance  – 51,349  (60.45%)   2 seats won

Elected:

• Abdullateef Ramadan Mohamed Al-Emhalhel

• Soad Mohamed Ramadan Soltan

Justice and Construction Party  – 5,239  (6.17%)   1 seat won

Elected:

• Mohamed Omran Milad Margam

There were no individual candidates in Central Tripoli

iii. Hay Al-Andalus    Seats: 3. Parties Standing: 33

National Central Party  – 30,321  (35.39%)   1 seat won

Elected:

• Lamia Mohamed Bin Shaker Asherif

Justice and Construction Party   11,382  (13.28%)   1 seat won

Elected:

• Majda Mohamed Asseghir Al-Falah

Al Asala and Development Party  – 6,267   (7.31%)   1 seat won

Elected:

• Safwan Ahmed Omar Milad

iv. Abu Sleem, Ain Zara   Seats: 4.   Parties: 32

National Forces Alliance  – 68,459  ( 64.20%)   3 seats won

Elected:

• Najya Assedeeq Abdullah Bayou

• Nasr Hassan Emegel Mohamed

• Mariam Ali Ahmed Farda

Justice and Construction Party  – 5,728  (5.37%)   1 seat won

Elected:

• Fawzia Abdul Salam Ahmed Karawan

v. Janzour   Seats: 3.   Parties Standing: 24

National Forces Alliance  – 30,006  (70.12%)   2 seats won

Elected:

• Ali Ibrahim Saad Asweh

• Soad Misbah Miloud Ertema

Justice and Construction Party   – 2,773  (6.48%)   1 seat won

Elected:

• Fathi Al-Arabi Abdul Gader Saleh

___

Constituency No. 12: Al Maya, Annasiriyah, Aziziya, Suwani Ben Adam, Qasr Ben Gashir and Emsehel, Essayeh, Esbea 

A. Individual List

Al Maya   Seats 1.   Candidates: 24

Elected:

• Mustafa Amer Ali Sola  – 2,216  (19.71%)

Annasiriyah   Seats: 1.   Candidates: 17

Elected:

• Jumma Asswiee Essaeh Ettef  – 2,577  (25.72%)

Aziziya   Seats: 1.   Candidates: 30

Elected:

• Abdulmajid Al Mahdi Miloud Azantuni  – 1,997  (15.77%)

Suwani Ben Adam   Seats: 1. Candidates: 31

Elected:

• Mustafa Jebril Mohamed Jebril     2,759  (19.38%)

Qasr Ben Gashir    Seats: 1.  Candidates: 19

Elected:

• Mohamed Misbah Omar Abu Ghamja  – 6,208  (24.49%)

Emsehel, Essayeh, Esbea   Seats: 1.   Candidates: 22

Elected:

• Othman Mabrouk Miftah Al-Ghedwi  – 1,743  (11.26%)

B. Party List    Seats 3, Parties 18

National Forces Alliance  – 55,194  (64.27%)   2 seats won

Elected:

• Abdul Fattah Saad Salem Hablous

• Asia Mohamed Wajdi Al-Marghani

Union for Homeland  – 4,281  (4.99%)   1 seat won

Elected:

• Abdullah Mohamed Abdullah Elkabir

___

Constituency No. 13:   Zawia, Sorman, Sabratha, Ajilat, Zuara, Al-Jmail, Rigdaleen, Ziltin 

Zawia   Seats: 4.   Candidates: 149

Elected:

• Mohamed Ahmed Al-Hadi Al-Kilani  – 9,785  (11.85%)

• Saeed Miftah Saeed Jarjar  –  3,815  (4.62%)

• Ahmed Tawfeeq Al-Haj Ahmed Youqoub  –  3,176  (3.85%)

• Mustafa Abdurrahman Ahmed Attriki  – 3,052  (3.70%)

Sorman   Seats: 1.   Candidates: 17

Elected:

• Adel Abdul Hameed Ali Asharshari  – 3,525  (19.70%)

Sabratha   Seats: 1.   Candidates: 22

Elected:

• Salah Masoud Abdussalam Mitu  – 10,348  (50.01%)

Ajilat   Seats: 1.   Candidates: 20

Elected:

• Besheer Mahmoud Mohamed Al-Hosh  2,131  (14.02%)

Zuara   Seats: 1.   Candidates: 13

Elected:

• Nouri Ali Mohamed Abu Sahmain 8,079  (58.07%)

Al-Jmail   Seats: 1.   Candidates: 19

Elected:

• Suliman Mabrouk Abdullah Al-Haj  – 5,435  (45.75%)

Rigdaleen   Seats: 1.   Candidates: 13

Elected:

• Ettaher Ali Haram Allateef  1,081  (16.85%)

B. Party Lists

i. Zawia   Seats: 4. Parties Standing:  22

National Forces Alliance  – 30,234  (37.77%)   2 seats won

Elected:

• Naeema Mohamed Nasr Al Hami

• Fathi Ali Mohamed Erhuma

Justice and Construction Party  – 13,219  (16.51%)   1 seat won

Elected:

• Khaled Ammar Ali Al-Mashri

Libya Al-Amal  – 6,093  (7.61%)   1 seat won

Elected:

• Abdulhamid Ismail Abdulhamid Yarbu

ii. Sorman, Sabratha, Ajilat, Zuara, Al-Jmail, Rigdaleen, Ziltin   Seats: 3.   Parties Standing: 20

National Forces Alliance  – 43,625  (52.17%)   2 seats won

Elected:

• Nouri Al-Jilani Abdul Salam Al-Jamal

• Asmaa Amara Mohamed Sariba

Justice and Construction Party  – 8,374  (10.01%)   1 seat won

Elected:

• Amina Omar Al-Mahjoub Ibrahim

References

Elections in Libya